MOT Charter School is a charter school in New Castle County, Delaware, United States. It was established in 2002 and operates on two campuses. The K-8 Academy is in the city limits of Middletown, while the high school is in an unincorporated area outside of the Middletown city limits, though it has a Middletown postal address.

MOT means "Middletown, Odessa, and Townsend".

History 
MOT Charter School was established in 2002 as a K–8 charter school. In June 2013, the Delaware State Board of Education approved MOT Charter's request to add a high school beginning in the 20142015 school year. Although the high school building was not yet completed for the 20142015 school year, the school expanded to ninth grade as planned, adding tenth grade in 2015–2016, eleventh grade in 2016–2017, and twelfth grade in 2017–2018, making the class of 2018 the first class to graduate from the high school.

Admissions 

Students are admitted to MOT Charter School using a lottery system. An open enrollment process is conducted annually; the process is set by Delaware regulations and runs from the first Monday in November until the second Wednesday in January. If the number of students applying for admission is greater than the number of seats available, a public lottery is run, with lottery winners invited to enroll in the school, and other students placed on a wait-list in the order determined by the lottery. If the number of students applying for admission is less than the number of seats available, all applicants are invited to enroll in the school.

Some students are offered preference in the lottery, such as if they have siblings or parents affiliated with the school, or (at the high school level) if the student has a particular interest in MOT Charter School's academic offerings. Preference is given to residents zoned for the Appoquinimink School District.

Academics 

MOT Charter High School's first graduating class, in 2018, had a 100 percent college acceptance rate, with every student receiving an offer of admission from at least one post-secondary institution. The class of 2019 also had a 100 percent college acceptance rate.

The high school offers 11 Advanced Placement classes, as well as a dual enrollment program with Wilmington University.

Athletics

High school 
MOT Charter High School is a member of the Diamond State Athletic Conference. The Mustangs compete in Division II for sports in which the DIAA has split schools into divisions for playoffs or state championship meets. MOT Charter High School fields teams in all three sports seasons.

The boys lacrosse team began varsity competition in the 20162017 school year. The varsity swim team was founded in the 20172018 school year.

Extracurricular activities

High school

MOT's chapter of the Technology Student Association has produced several state officers, state champions, and national finalists, and the 2019–2020 National Vice President.

References

External links 
 
 High school athletics website 
 Middle school athletics website
 

Buildings and structures in Middletown, Delaware
Charter K-12 schools in Delaware
Schools in New Castle County, Delaware
High schools in New Castle County, Delaware
Educational institutions established in 2002
2002 establishments in Delaware